was a Japanese physicist  and a pioneer of Japanese physics during the Meiji period.

Life 

Nagaoka was born in Nagasaki, Japan on August 19, 1865 and educated at the University of Tokyo. After graduating with a degree in physics in 1887, Nagaoka worked with a visiting Scottish physicist, Cargill Gilston Knott, on early problems in magnetism, namely magnetostriction in liquid nickel. In 1893, Nagaoka traveled to Europe, where he continued his education at the universities of Berlin, Munich, and Vienna, including courses on Saturn's rings and a course with Ludwig Boltzmann on his Kinetic Theory of Gases, two influences which would be reflected in Nagaoka's later work. Nagaoka also attended, in 1900, the First International Congress of Physicists in Paris, where he heard Marie Curie lecture on radioactivity, an event that aroused Nagaoka's interest in atomic physics. Nagaoka returned to Japan in 1901 and served as professor of physics at Tokyo University until 1925. After his retirement from Tokyo University, Nagaoka was appointed a head scientist at RIKEN, and also served as the first president of Osaka University, from 1931 to 1934.

His granddaughter was pianist Nagaoka Nobuko.

Saturnian model of the atom

By 1900 physicists had begun to consider new models for the structure of the atom. The recent discovery by J. J. Thomson of the negatively charged electron implied that a neutral atom must also contain an opposite positive charge. In 1904, Thomson suggested that the atom was a sphere of uniform positive electrification, with electrons scattered through it like plums in a pudding, giving rise to the term plum pudding model.

Nagaoka rejected Thomson's model on the grounds that opposite charges are impenetrable. In 1904, Nagaoka proposed an alternative planetary model of the atom in which a positively charged center is surrounded by a number of revolving electrons, in the manner of Saturn and its rings.

Nagaoka's model made two predictions:
 a very massive atomic center (in analogy to a very massive planet)
 electrons revolving around the nucleus, bound by electrostatic forces (in analogy to the rings revolving around Saturn, bound by gravitational forces).

Both predictions were successfully confirmed by Ernest Rutherford, who mentions Nagaoka's model in his 1911 paper in which the atomic nucleus is proposed. However, other details of the model were incorrect. In particular, electrically charged rings would be unstable due to repulsive disruption. Nagaoka himself abandoned his proposed model in 1908.

Rutherford and Niels Bohr would present the more viable Bohr model in 1913.

Other works

Nagaoka later did research in spectroscopy and other fields. In 1909, he published a paper on the inductance of solenoids.  In 1929 he became the first person to describe meteor burst communications.

Awards and recognition

For his lifetime of scientific work, Nagaoka was granted the Order of Culture by the Japanese government in 1937.
The Nagaoka crater on the Moon is named after him.

References

Sources

External links
 H. Nagaoka
 Historical Figures of RIKEN

1865 births
1950 deaths
Japanese physicists
People from Nagasaki Prefecture
Recipients of the Order of Culture
Academic staff of Osaka University
Academic staff of the University of Tokyo
University of Tokyo alumni
Theoretical physicists
Honorary Members of the USSR Academy of Sciences
Riken personnel
Fellows of the American Physical Society
Members of the Japan Academy